You Sang-joo (born 11 December 1968) is a retired South Korean fencer. He competed in the individual and team sabre events at the 1996 Summer Olympics.

References

External links
 

1968 births
Living people
South Korean male sabre fencers
Olympic fencers of South Korea
Fencers at the 1996 Summer Olympics
Asian Games medalists in fencing
Fencers at the 1990 Asian Games
Fencers at the 1994 Asian Games
Asian Games silver medalists for South Korea
Asian Games bronze medalists for South Korea
Medalists at the 1990 Asian Games
Medalists at the 1994 Asian Games